Raabta may refer to:

Raabta (film), a 2017 Indian Hindi film
"Raabta" (song), a song from the album of the 2012 Indian Hindi film, Agent Vinod